Palaquium thwaitesii is a species of plant in the family Sapotaceae. It is endemic to Sri Lanka.

Leaves
Scattered, oblong-lanceolate-linear, tapering ends, lateral veins inconspicuous.

Trunk
Young parts rusty hairy.

Flowers
Solitary or 2's in leaf axils.

Fruits
Ovoid, pointed berry.

Ecology
Rain forest understory of wet zone.

Uses
Wood - plywood.

References

thwaitesii
Endemic flora of Sri Lanka
Taxonomy articles created by Polbot